The Little Calfpasture River is a  tributary of the Maury River in the U.S. state of Virginia. It is part of the James River watershed.

Background
The river rises east of Elliott Knob on Great North Mountain in the Allegheny Mountains of western Virginia, in Augusta County. Flowing southwest between North Mountain and Little North Mountain, the Little Calfpasture enters Rockbridge County and joins the Calfpasture River to form the Maury River just upstream of Goshen Pass, a water gap through Little North Mountain.

The Little Calfpasture River passes the village of Augusta Springs and the town of Craigsville along its course. It passes through the Goshen Scout Reservation and is dammed to form Lake Merriweather.

Further reading

See also
 Lake Merriweather
List of rivers of Virginia

References

External links

Rivers of Virginia
Tributaries of the James River
Rivers of Augusta County, Virginia
Rivers of Rockbridge County, Virginia